Liu Zhaowu (born 12 October 1988, in Fujian, China) is a Chinese archer. At the 2012 Summer Olympics he competed for his country in the Men's individual and team events.

References

Chinese male archers
1988 births
Living people
Olympic archers of China
Archers at the 2012 Summer Olympics
Sportspeople from Fujian
Universiade medalists in archery
Universiade gold medalists for China
Medalists at the 2011 Summer Universiade
21st-century Chinese people